Wyoming Highway 192 (WYO 192) is a  state highway in southeastern Johnson County, Wyoming.

Route description
Wyoming Highway 192 begins its western end in Kaycee at an intersection with Wyoming Highway 196 (Nolan Avenue) and the eastern terminus of Wyoming Highway 191 (Mayoworth Road). Exit 254 of Interstate 25/U.S. Route 87, which lies just west of here, can be accessed via WYO 191
. WYO 192 travels predominantly east out of Kaycee into outlying areas before turning south and then southeast for the remainder of its routing.

Major intersections

References

External links

Wyoming Routes 100-199
WYO 192 - WYO 387 to WYO 191/WYO 196
Kaycee, WY Chamber of Commerce

Transportation in Johnson County, Wyoming
192